Upper Mesa Falls is a waterfall on the Henrys Fork in the Caribou-Targhee National Forest.

Formation

Mesa Falls Tuff, which is the rock over which Upper Mesa Falls cascades, was formed 1.3 million years ago.  A cycle of rhyolitic volcanism from the Henrys Fork caldera deposited a thick layer of rock and ash across the area.  This layer compressed and hardened over time.

Between 200,000 and 600,000 years ago, the river eroded a wide canyon which was subsequently partly filled with basalt lava flows. The Henrys Fork of the Snake River then carved the channel through the basalt; which is the inner canyon seen today.

See also

 List of waterfalls in Idaho

References

External links
 Mesa Falls Visitor Center (USDA Forest Service - Caribou-Targhee National Forest)

Landforms of Fremont County, Idaho
Waterfalls of Idaho
Tourist attractions in Fremont County, Idaho
Block waterfalls
Articles containing video clips